Barrule may refer to:

MV Barrule, an Empire F type coaster in service with Southern Shipping Ltd, 1950-54
North Barrule, a hill on the Isle of Man, lying mainly in the parish of Maughold
South Barrule, a hill on the Isle of Man
Barrule (band), band from the Isle of Man